The bullnose ray (Myliobatis freminvillii) is an eagle ray, which is widely distributed in the western Atlantic. It is found at depth above  in coastal waters from Cape Cod down to Argentina, but is absent from parts of the western central Atlantic. It is often confused with the southern eagle ray (M. goodei). The bullnose ray feeds mostly hermit crabs, gastropods, and bivalves.

References

Myliobatis
Fish described in 1824
Taxobox binomials not recognized by IUCN 

Springer Link